Muhammadkhuja Iskandarovich Yaqubov (born 31 March 1995) is a Tajikistani professional boxer who has held the WBC International super-featherweight title since 2018.

Amateur career
Yaqubov started boxing at the age of 10 and reached the rank of Candidate for Master of Sport (кмс).

Professional career
Yaqubov turned professional in late 2015, signing a deal with RCC Boxing Promotions. He soon made his debut on 12 December of that year, defeating fellow debutant Vladimir Terekhov in Saint Petersburg. After three more victories he received his first title shot on 15 November 2016, and defeated Nikolai Buzolin by eighth-round technical knockout (TKO) to win the WBC–ABCO Continental lightweight title. He retained it three months later against veteran Yogli Herrera by way of unanimous decision (UD). In his next fight he picked up the vacant WBO Youth lightweight title; his opponent Feruzbek Yuldashev didn't answer the bell for the fifth round due to injury. Two months later he successfully defended it, scoring three knockdowns en route to a first-round TKO of Japanese challenger Daiki Ichikawa.

On 10 February 2018, Yaqubov defeated young prospect Mark Urvanov by UD in Yekaterinburg, adding the WBA Continental and IBF Baltic super-featherweight titles to his résumé. He won the vacant WBC International super-featherweight title a few months after that, stopping Víctor Alejandro Zúñiga in the first round with a shot to the solar plexus on 19 August. In his first defense of the WBC International belt in February 2019, he decisioned Emanuel López at the KRK Uralets. He also outpointed NABF champ Abraham Montoya and former world champ Tomás Rojas in subsequent title bouts. Yaqubov made his fourth WBC International title defense against Lunga Sitemela on 27 March 2021, whom he beat by unanimous decision.

Yaubov is scheduled to face O'Shaquie Foster in a WBC title eliminator on 18 March 2022, on the undercard of the Sunny Edwards and Muhammad Waseem IBF title bout. He lost the fight by unanimous decision, with scores of 118–109, 117–110 and 117–110. Yaubov rebounded from the first loss of his professional career with a unanimous decision victory over Carlos Daniel Cordoba on 11 September 2022.

Professional boxing record

References

External links
 
 Muhammadkhuja Yaqubov at boxinggu.ru (in Russian)

Living people
1996 births
Tajikistani male boxers
Super-featherweight boxers
Lightweight boxers
People from Isfara